István Sugár (12 October 1904 – 1991) was a Hungarian sprinter. He competed in the men's 4 × 100 metres relay and the 200 metres at the 1928 Summer Olympics.

References

External links
 

1904 births
1991 deaths
Athletes (track and field) at the 1928 Summer Olympics
Hungarian male sprinters
Olympic athletes of Hungary
Place of birth missing